Ferhat Bıkmaz (born 6 July 1988) is a Turkish footballer who plays as a midfielder for OSV Hannover.

References

External links
 
 
 

1988 births
Living people
German people of Turkish descent
Footballers from Hanover
Turkish footballers
German footballers
Association football fullbacks
Association football midfielders
Turkey under-21 international footballers
Turkey youth international footballers
Bundesliga players
Süper Lig players
Hannover 96 II players
Hannover 96 players
Sivasspor footballers
Akhisarspor footballers
VfB Oldenburg players
TSV Havelse players
Hannoverscher SC players